Chyorny Volcano (Вулкан Чёрный - Black Volcano) is a stratovolcano situated in the central Kamchatka peninsula in Russia.

See also
List of volcanoes in Russia

References

Volcanoes of the Kamchatka Peninsula
Mountains of the Kamchatka Peninsula
Stratovolcanoes of Russia
Holocene stratovolcanoes
Holocene Asia